Flint Ridge is a north-south trending ridge with a summit elevation of  in the Asgard Range of Victoria Land, Antarctica. On the eastern part of the cliff is Dominion Hill, a rounded rock summit rising to about  that borders the glacier where it descends southeastward into Taylor Valley.

Nomenclature 
Hills of Victoria Land
McMurdo Dry Valleys
Flint Ridge, Sagittate Hill, and Noxon Cliff were all named by the Advisory Committee on Antarctic Names, while Dominion Hill was named by the New Zealand Geographic Board. 

The ridge was named for Lawrence A. Flint, manager of the United States Antarctic Research Program Berg Field Center at McMurdo Station in 1972. A standard United States Geological Survey (USGS) survey tablet stamped "Flint ET 1971–72" was fixed in a rock slab atop this ridge by the USGS Electronic Traverse, 1971–72.

Sagittate Hill was named in 1997 from the shape of the hill which is suggestive of an arrowhead, or the characteristic leaf form.

The cliff was named in 1997 after John F. Noxon, who pioneered the technique of visible spectroscopy for measurements of stratospheric trace gases, particularly nitrogen dioxide. By 1975, he began making measurements of nitrogen dioxide column as a function of latitude, and was surprised to discover an abrupt decrease in the amounts in Arctic air as compared to values observed at lower latitudes. This unexpected phenomenon, width implications for later ozone depletion studies, became known as the "Noxon cliff". In 1978, Noxon sailed on RV Hero from Ushuaia, Argentina, and quickly confirmed that a "cliff" in nitrogen dioxide is also found in the Antarctic atmosphere.

Dominion Hill was named in 1998 after "dominion", a form of government. The name was intended to complement that of the Commonwealth Glacier, which itself references the Commonwealth of Australia.

References 

Ridges of Victoria Land
Scott Coast